"Everybody Hurts" is the 45th episode of the HBO original series The Sopranos and the sixth of the show's fourth season. Written by Michael Imperioli and directed by Steve Buscemi, it originally aired on October 20, 2002.

Starring
 James Gandolfini as Tony Soprano
 Lorraine Bracco as Jennifer Melfi
 Edie Falco as Carmela Soprano
 Michael Imperioli as Christopher Moltisanti
 Dominic Chianese as Corrado Soprano, Jr. *
 Steven Van Zandt as Silvio Dante *
 Tony Sirico as Paulie Gualtieri *
 Robert Iler as Anthony Soprano, Jr.
 Jamie-Lynn Sigler as Meadow Soprano
 Drea de Matteo as Adriana La Cerva
 Aida Turturro as Janice Soprano
 John Ventimiglia as Artie Bucco
 Kathrine Narducci as Charmaine Bucco
 Federico Castelluccio as Furio Giunta
 Joe Pantoliano as Ralph Cifaretto

* = credit only

Guest starring

Synopsis

Carmela tells Tony "that nice sales-lady" Gloria Trillo (his mistress) has committed suicide. Tony goes to the car showroom to find out more, then furiously confronts Dr. Melfi, who explains that he should not blame her, or himself, for her death.

Plagued by guilt, Tony seeks ways to prove he is a good person and performs some generous acts for his friends and family. He signs a living trust for Carmela, in place of the one he refused to sign before. He arranges for Brian Cammarata to be provided with discounted suits, then takes Janice out for a companionable dinner. He continues his good deeds with another dinner where Furio is introduced to a blind date arranged by Carmela. She smiles uneasily, seeing them get on well.

A.J.'s friends are curious about his family's lifestyle, but when he visits the lavish home of his girlfriend Devin Pillsbury, he is intimidated when he realizes how wealthy her family is. When his friends ask why his family does not have "Don Corleone money", he is unable to answer.

One evening, high on heroin, Christopher receives a call from Tony instructing him to meet in twenty minutes. Tony says that to limit his own exposure, he will be giving more of his orders through Christopher, who will help "take the family into the 21st century." Christopher feels deeply honored, but continues to take heroin.

Artie has a new French hostess at Nuovo Vesuvio, Élodie, who he flirts with. Her brother, Jean Philippe, asks for a $50,000 bridge loan to conclude a deal to distribute Armagnac in the United States. Artie agrees to lend him the money at 13 percent interest. He tries to borrow the money from Ralphie, who declines but mentions it to Tony. Tony meets Artie, reminds him of their friendship, and insists that he accept the loan from him at only one-and-a-half percent interest.

Ten days pass and Jean-Philippe is not answering his phone. Artie confronts him at his home. Jean-Philippe reveals that the deal has failed and he does not have the money. Artie attacks him, but Jean-Philippe gains the upper hand, rips out his earring and throws him out. At home, Artie overdoses on alcohol and pills and calls Tony to apologize. Tony deduces that he is trying to kill himself and calls 911. At the hospital, Tony says that Artie can clear his tab at Nuovo Vesuvio in lieu of payment. Artie expresses admiration that Tony could foresee that the deal would go bad and so he would be able to profit from it; this observation infuriates Tony. Furio is sent by Tony to Jean-Philippe's apartment to collect the debt.

First appearances
 Devin Pillsbury: A.J.'s girlfriend.
 Matt Testa: A.J.'s friend.

Deceased
 Gloria Trillo: Tony learns of Gloria's suicide by hanging in this episode.

Title reference
 The episode's title refers to the emotional difficulties faced by Tony, Adriana, Artie, Gloria, and Dr. Melfi. “Everybody Hurts” is also the title of a popular early-90s ballad by influential American rock band R.E.M.

Cultural references
 The Beatles' Rubber Soul (1965) album is featured in one scene, wherein a mint copy was part of Devin's father's record collection.
 A.J.'s friends refer to The Godfather Part II and Don Vito Corleone several times.
 Devin's father has several Pablo Picasso paintings displayed in his home.
Pillsbury is a type of dough.  It is common for Italian Americans to refer to non-Italians as anything to do with dough, cake, or white bread

Music

 Armand Van Helden's "Kentucky Fried Flow" is played when Christopher and his friend are seen in a bathroom and his friend is vomiting, while Christopher is looking in the mirror after shooting heroin
 Weezer's "Island in the Sun" is played during the conversation between Carmela and Adriana at the gym
 "I Only Have Eyes For You," by The Flamingos, is played in the scene where Tony has dinner with Janice
 D'Angelo's "Untitled (How Does It Feel)" is playing when A.J. and Devin are making out on the couch in the Soprano home
 The Aquatones's "You" plays as Tony dreams about Gloria
 "Ballin' Out Of Control" - Jermaine Dupri, Featuring Nate Dogg
 "Vesuvio" by Spaccanapoli is the sensual dance song played at Furio's housewarming (also known as "Furio's Song")
 "Em'Ma" - Manu Dibango
 "Tout doucement" - Bibie
 Billy Joel's "Scenes from an Italian Restaurant" is played in a scene near the end, where Tony, Carmela, and their guests have a meal at an Italian restaurant, presumably following the Billy Joel concert
 The song played over the end credits is "Take Me for a Little While" by Dave Edmunds

References

External links
"Everybody Hurts"  at HBO

The Sopranos (season 4) episodes
2002 American television episodes
Television episodes about suicide